Williamina "Minnie" Dean (2 September 1844 – 12 August 1895) was a New Zealander who was found guilty of infanticide and hanged. She was the only woman to receive the death penalty in New Zealand, although several others were sentenced to capital punishment, but had their sentences commuted to either life or long duration imprisonment.

Early life
Minnie McCulloch was born in Greenock, in western central Scotland. Her father, John McCulloch, was a railway engineer. Her mother, Elizabeth Swan, died of cancer in 1857. It is unknown when she arrived in New Zealand, but by the early 1860s, she was living in Invercargill with two young children. She claimed she was the widow of a Tasmanian doctor, although no evidence of a marriage has been found. She was still using her birth name, McCulloch.

In 1872, she married an innkeeper named Charles Dean. The two lived in Etal Creek, between Ohai and Lumsden, then an important stop on the route from Riverton to the Otago goldfields. When the gold rush died down, the couple turned to farming, but were soon in dire financial straits. The family moved to Winton, where Charles Dean took up pig farming while Minnie began to earn money by taking in unwanted children in exchange for payment. In an era when there were few methods of contraception, and when childbirth outside marriage was frowned upon, there were many women wishing to discreetly send their children away for adoption, so Minnie Dean did not lack customers. It is believed that she was responsible for as many as nine young children at any one time. She received payment either weekly or in a lump sum.

Infant mortality was a significant problem in New Zealand at this time (as it was estimated to run to about 80 to 100 infants out of 1000 colonial births). As such, a number of children under Dean's care died of various illnesses. In March 1889, a six-month-old child had died of convulsions; in October 1891, a six-week-old baby had perished from cardiovascular and respiratory ailments; and a boy allegedly drowned under her care in 1894 and she hid the body in her garden, arousing further suspicions. A coroner's inquest was held, and Dean was not held responsible for the deaths, due to universally-poor hygiene standards, even at childbirth itself. Nevertheless, the community came to mistrust Dean, and rumours of mistreatment circulated. Additionally, children under Dean's care allegedly went missing without explanation. In the public's mind, this linked Dean to cases of infanticide or baby farming in the United Kingdom and Australia, where women killed children under their care to avoid having to support them. At the time, lax childcare legislation meant that Dean did not have to keep records of the children she agreed to take in, so proving that the children had disappeared was difficult.

Before Dean's trial and execution, four other women had been tried and sentenced to death--Caroline Whitting (found guilty in 1872), Phoebe Veitch (1883), and Sarah-Jane and Anna Flannagan (1891). In each case, these sentences were commuted to life imprisonment; in each case, child murder was the culpable offence. 30 years later, in 1926, Daniel Cooper was also convicted of baby farming and executed for the offence, although his second wife Martha was acquitted. In a broader, international context, Dean's misdeeds may also have been viewed in the same light as late Victorian contemporaries and fellow "baby farmers" such as Amelia Dyer in the United Kingdom (convicted in 1896) and John and Sarah Makin (1893) and Frances Lydia Alice Knorr in New South Wales (1893), as well as previous New Zealand historical instances of ostensibly deliberate child deaths. Certainly, given the proximity of New South Wales, the Makin case featured in New Zealand newspapers during the same period as the Minnie Dean controversy and trial.

Murder case and execution
In 1895, Dean was observed boarding a train carrying a young baby and a hatbox, but was later observed leaving the same train without the baby and only the hatbox. As railway porters later testified, the hatbox was suspiciously heavy. A woman, Jane Hornsby, came forward claiming to have given her granddaughter, Eva, to Dean, and clothes identified as belonging to this child were found at Dean's residence, but Dean could not produce the child herself. A search along the railway line found no sign of the child. Dean was arrested and charged with murder. Her garden was dug up, and three bodies (two of babies, and one of a boy estimated to be three years old) were uncovered. An inquest found that one child (Eva) had died of suffocation and one, later identified as one-year-old Dorothy Edith Carter, had died from an overdose of laudanum (used on children to sedate them). The cause of death for the third child was not determined. Dean was charged with their murder.

In her trial, Dean's lawyer Alfred Hanlon argued that all deaths were accidental, and that they had been covered up to prevent adverse publicity of the sort that Dean had previously received. On 21 June 1895, however, Dean was found guilty of Dorothy Carter's murder, and sentenced to death. Between June and August 1895, Dean wrote her own account of her life. Altogether, she claimed to have cared for 28 children. Of these, five were in good health when her establishment was raided, six had died whilst under her care, and one had been reclaimed by her parents. Apart from her two adopted daughters, that left fourteen or so children unaccounted for, according to her own record.

On 12 August, she was hanged by the official executioner Tom Long at the Invercargill gaol, at the intersection of Spey and Leven streets, in what is now the Noel Leeming carpark. She is the only woman to have been executed in New Zealand, and as capital punishment in New Zealand has been abolished, it is likely that she will retain that distinction. She is buried in Winton, alongside her husband, who died in a house fire in 1908. Her crimes led to the belated passage of child welfare legislation in New Zealand—the Infant Life Protection Act 1893 and the Infant Protection Act 1896.

In popular culture
In 1985, Dean's trial was the subject of "In Defence of Minnie Dean", the first episode of the Emmy-nominated Hanlon New Zealand television drama series about the career of Dean's lawyer. The episode won the Best Director, Best Drama Programme, Drama Script, and Performance, Female, in a Dramatic Role categories at the 1986 Listener Television Awards (also called the GOFTA Awards), and "contributed to a re-evaluation of Dean's conviction".

Minnie Dean is referenced in Dudley Benson's 2006 song "It's Akaroa's Fault" ("I don't want to meet Minnie Dean at the end of my life/If I were to meet her I'd keep her hatbox in sight"). Authors Lynley Hood and John Rawle wrote posthumous accounts and reconstructions of the case as the centenary of her apprehension and execution occurred, in 1995.

On Friday 30 January 2009 the Otago Daily Times reported that a headstone had appeared mysteriously on Dean's grave. The headstone reads "Minnie Dean is part of Winton's history Where she now lies is now no mystery". It is unknown who placed the headstone there. Her family had been considering it but claim that this was not their doing.

The Southland Times reported on 23 February 2009 that the family laid a headstone to honour Dean and her husband's grave.

At the 2012 Edinburgh Fringe Festival, a play titled "A Cry Too Far From Heaven" was performed by a Southland (NZ) theatre company and featured Minnie Dean as one of the title characters on her last night before execution.

In 2013, the New Zealand musician Marlon Williams wrote a song inspired by Minnie's case, entitled "Ballad of Minnie Dean".

See also
Winifred Carrick and Lillian Fanny Jane Hobbs, acquitted of child murder in New Zealand
Infanticide in Nineteenth Century New Zealand
List of serial killers by country

References

Dictionary of New Zealand Biography – Minnie Dean
Crime.co.nz – Minnie Dean
1966 Encyclopaedia of New Zealand – HANLON, Alfred Charles, K.C.
Mystery headstone on Dean's grave – Otago Daily Times
Dean's headstone officially unveiled – The Southland Times
Dean's headstone officially unveiled – waymarking.com

Bibliography
Lynley Hood: Minnie Dean: Her Life and Crimes: Auckland: Penguin: 1994: 
John Rawle: Minnie Dean: One Hundred Years of Memory: Christchurch: Orca Publishing: 1997:

External links
In Defence of Minnie Dean, the first episode of the Hanlon television series, based on Dean's trial, streamed free at NZ On Screen.

1844 births
1895 deaths
1895 murders in New Zealand
19th-century executions by New Zealand
19th-century New Zealand people
19th-century New Zealand women
Executed Scottish people
Executed Scottish women
British female serial killers
Executed New Zealand people
Executed New Zealand serial killers
Executed New Zealand women
New Zealand female serial killers
New Zealand female murderers
New Zealand murderers of children
New Zealand people convicted of murder
New Zealand people of Scottish descent
People convicted of murder by New Zealand
People executed for murder
People executed by New Zealand by hanging
People from Greenock
Baby farming